The Dad's Army missing episodes are lost episodes of the British warfare sitcom programme Dad's Army, plus some short sketches. The programme ran for nine series between 31 July 1968 and 13 November 1977. Three out of six episodes from Series 2 and two of the four Christmas sketches (1968 and 1970) are missing as at that time, the BBC routinely reused videotape as a cost saving measure.

Background
Until 1978, when the BBC Film and Videotape Library was created as a permanent archive for all its television programmes, the BBC had no central archive. The videotapes and film recordings stored in the BBC's various libraries were often either wiped or discarded for recording new programmes and to free storage space to reduce costs. The BBC Film Library kept only some programmes that were made on film, whilst the Engineering Department handled videotape but had no mandate to retain material. Some shows were kept by BBC Enterprises, but they too had limited storage space and only kept material that was considered commercially exploitable. In the mid-1970s, BBC Enterprises disposed of much older material for which the rights to sell the programmes had expired, and the Engineering Department routinely wiped videotapes in an era when rescreening potential was limited.

The first two series (12 episodes) of Dad's Army were made in black-and-white, with almost all episodes made on two-inch quad videotape for initial broadcast. The first series was thought to have commercial potential overseas, and was offered for sale to foreign broadcasters by BBC Enterprises. To this end, 16mm film copies were made of the first six episodes by the BBC Engineering Department before the master videotapes were wiped, and these were retained by the Film Unit.

In the event, the first series sold very poorly and so BBC Enterprises did not express any interest in selling Series 2 abroad. Thus very few film copies of Series 2 episodes were made. Dad's Army was made in colour from Series 3 onwards; overseas interest in the series picked up, and BBC Enterprises resumed offering the episodes for sale in film and video format; this meant they were more likely to be permanently retained.

Recovery
In 1998, David Croft made an appeal on BBC Two asking people if they held an off-air video copy of the missing episodes. At the time, five of the six episodes of series 2 were missing. "Sgt. Wilson's Little Secret" had survived the cull as it was recorded onto 35 mm film instead of videotape, either because it required additional editing (which was easier with film before the advent of electronic timecode editing) or because no videotape recording facilities were available in the recording period. This fortuitously assured the episode's survival: as a production made on film, it fell within the BBC Film Library's remit of retaining filmed productions.

In 2001, 16 mm film recordings of "Operation Kilt" and "The Battle of Godfrey's Cottage" were returned to the BBC archive. It has since been established that the two episodes were film recorded to show to executives at Columbia Pictures during discussions on the structure of the Dad's Army feature film. The film copies were then junked and retrieved from a skip by an opportunistic collector and stored in a garden shed for 30 years until returned to the BBC.

The three Series 2 episodes that remain missing are "The Loneliness of the Long Distance Walker", "A Stripe for Frazer" and "Under Fire". The only currently remaining hope for recovery is either that the lost episodes were recorded off-air during their original UK broadcasts using an early videotape recorder such as a Shibaden or Sony CV-2000 machine, or 16 mm tele-recordings being saved from being junked. However these three episodes were among the 67 adapted for BBC Radio in the 1970s, and recordings of the radio episodes still exist.

Christmas sketches
Two of the four Christmas sketches which aired as part of Christmas Night with the Stars from 1968 "Santa On Patrol" and 1970 "Cornish Floral Dance" (which were made in colour) remain missing, though audio recordings of both have been recovered. The "Cornish Floral Dance" was also performed at the Royal Variety Performance of 1975. This second version is still extant.

Colour episodes
The colour episodes in series 3–9 have been remarkably fortunate compared with many of their contemporaries. Missing episodes were returned from overseas broadcasters, mainly from those in Europe, New Zealand and Australia, with the result that all full-length episodes now exist in the original colour format.

Restoration and recreation

Colour restoration
By the 1990s, "Room at the Bottom", the sixth episode of Series 3, was the only episode produced in colour that did not have a colour copy in the archive; instead, it survived only as a 16 mm black-and-white film recording. Because of the way in which the original black and white telerecordings were made, colour information was sometimes inadvertently preserved in them even though it could not be displayed. In 2008, a computer technique of colour recovery was developed to recover the colour information from telerecordings, known as chroma dots, to recreate a usable colour signal. "Room at the Bottom" was used as the pilot project to test this process of colour recovery, with the success of the episode's restoration leading to it being used on other 16mm telerecordings. The new colour copy was officially adopted as the BBC's archive copy, and "Room at the Bottom" was broadcast in colour for the first time in almost forty years on 13 December 2008.

Recreations

Restagings
Although not a deliberate attempt to restore lost material, the "Cornish Floral Dance" was also performed at the Royal Variety Performance of 1975. This second version is still extant.

Animated episode
In 2008, the soundtrack of "A Stripe for Frazer" was rediscovered in the hands of a private collector. This recording was then digitally remastered for a 2015 BBC Audio CD release. In January 2016, it was announced that the BBC were creating an animated version of the episode, to be combined with the newly discovered copy of the audio, which was released via the BBC Store online service.

Pre-production for "A Stripe for Frazer" began in October 2015 and a little under 12 weeks later the finished animated episode was released on BBC Store 4 February 2016. The animation was produced and directed for BBC Worldwide by Charles Norton and a team that included comic book artist, Martin Geraghty.

Remake
In 2018, UKTV announced plans to recreate the three missing episodes for broadcast on its Gold channel under the title Dad's Army: The Lost Episodes. Mercury Productions, the company responsible for Saluting Dad's Army, Gold's 50th anniversary tribute series, produced the episodes, directed by Ben Kellett. The recreations were broadcast in 2019, coinciding with the 50th anniversary of their original broadcast on the BBC. Kevin McNally and Robert Bathurst were the initial casting announcements as Captain Mainwaring and Sergeant Wilson, with Bernard Cribbins portraying Private Godfrey. The full cast was announced in January 2019, with McNally, Bathurst and Cribbins joined by Kevin Eldon, Mathew Horne, David Hayman and Tom Rosenthal. However, Bernard Cribbins subsequently withdrew from the project, and was replaced as Godfrey by Timothy West. The recreated episodes were shown in August 2019 and released on DVD & Blu Ray on 25 November 2019 by the  British Network imprint. The series also ran on Yesterday on 25–28 August 2020.

Cast
Kevin McNally – Captain Mainwaring
Robert Bathurst – Sergeant Wilson
Kevin Eldon – Lance Corporal Jones
David Hayman – Private Frazer
Mathew Horne – Private Walker
Timothy West – Private Godfrey
Tom Rosenthal – Private Pike

List of missing content

Episodes

Sketches

Further research

Documentaries
Dad's Army: Missing Presumed Wiped (2001) – a 30-minute documentary about episode recoveries and restoration.
Time Shift – Missing Believed Wiped (2003) – a general documentary about archive television, featuring some clips and discussions about Dad's Army.

Overseas broadcasters that purchased Series 2

See also
 Wiping
 BBC Archive Treasure Hunt
 Missing Believed Wiped
 Doctor Who missing episodes

Notes

References

External links
 BBC Missing episode list 
 A Stripe For Frazer: Animating the lost episode of Dad's Army at BBC Blogs
 
 
 
 

 
Dad's Army